Universities in Hungary have generally been instituted by Act of Parliament under the Higher Education Act. For new public universities and private universities, approval is required from the Ministry of responsible for the education and later from the Hungarian National Assembly. The Hungarian public higher education system includes universities and other higher education institutes, that provide both education curricula and related degrees up to doctoral degree and also contribute to research activities. In general, public Hungarian universities don't charge tuition fees.

The following is a list of universities and colleges of higher education in Hungary (listed alphabetically and grouped by location and funding), followed by a list of defunct institutions.

Universities

In Budapest

Public institutions of higher education

Ecclesiastical institutions of higher education

Private or foundation institutions of higher education

In the rest of the country

Public institutions of higher education

Privately or church funded universities
 Debrecen Reformed Theological University
 Milton Friedman University

Other Hungarian-language universities

Former universities
 Albert Szent-Györgyi Medical University (merged with others to form University of Szeged in 2000)
 Attila József University (merged with others to form University of Szeged in 2000)
 Debrecen University of Agricultural Sciences (merged with others to form University of Debrecen)
 Franz Joseph University (ceased operation in 1945)
 Gödöllő University of Agricultural Sciences (merged with others to form Szent István University in 2000)
 Hungarian University of Applied Arts (renamed to Moholy-Nagy University of Art and Design in 2006)
 Hungarian University of Physical Education (merged with Semmelweis University)
 Imre Haynal University of Health Sciences Budapest (merged with Semmelweis University)
 Janus Pannonius University (merged with others to form University of Pécs in 2000)
 Lajos Kossuth University (merged with others to form University of Debrecen)
 Miklós Zrínyi University of National Defence (merged with others to form National University of Public Service in 2012)
 University Medical School of Debrecen (merged with others to form University of Debrecen)
 University Medical School of Pécs (merged with others to form University of Pécs in 2000)
 University of Horticulture and Food Industry (merged with others to form Szent István University in 2000)
 University of Sopron (merged with others to form University of Western Hungary in 2000)
 University of Veterinary Science (merged with others to form Szent István University in 2000)

Colleges of higher education

In Budapest

State funded
 Hungarian Dance Academy

Privately or church funded
 Avicenna International College
 Baptist Theological Academy
 Bhaktivedanta Theological College
 Budapest College of Management
 Budapest Contemporary Dance Academy
 CBS Central European International College
 Duna International College
 Gábor Dénes College
 The Gate of the Teaching Buddhist College
 Harsányi János College
 International Business School, Budapest
 International Pető András Institute of Conductive Education for the Motor Disabled and Conductor-Teacher Training College
 John Wesley Theological College
 Pentacostal Theological College
 Sapientia School of Theology
 Milton Friedman University
 Sola Scriptura Theological College
 Szent Pál Academy
 Wekerle Business School

In the rest of the country

State funded
 College of Szolnok, Szolnok
 Eötvös József College, Baja
 Kecskemét College, Kecskemét

Privately or church funded
 Adventist Theological College, Pécel
 Apor Vilmos Catholic College, Vác
 Archiepiscopal Theological College of Veszprém, Veszprém
 College of Modern Business Studies, Tatabánya
 Gál Ferenc Theological College, Szeged
 Győri Theological College, Győr
 Kodolányi János University, Budapest, Székesfehérvár, Orosháza
 Pápa Theological Academy of the Reformed Church, Pápa
 Sárospatak Theological Academy of the Reformed Church, Sárospatak
 Szent Atanáz Greek Catholic Theological Institute, Nyíregyháza
 Szent Bernát Theological College, Zirc
 Theological College of Eger, Eger
 Theological College of Esztergom, Esztergom
  ., Pécs
 Tomori Pál College, Kalocsa

Former colleges of higher education
 Berzsenyi Dániel College (merged with University of West Hungary)
 Kölcsey Ferenc Reformed Teacher's Training College (merged with Debrecen Reformed Theological University)
 Police College (merged with others to form National University of Public Service in 2012)
 Vitéz János Roman Catholic Teacher's Training College (merged with Pázmány Péter Catholic University)

See also
 Open access in Hungary

References

External links
http://www.okm.gov.hu/felsooktatas/felsooktatasi-intezmenyek - List of institutions of higher education on the website of the Hungarian Ministry of Education and Culture
List of approved institutions of higher education by the state of Hungarian Republic, appendix 1. for article CXXXIX. of 2005 - Oh.gov.hu - Office of Education
 http://mek.oszk.hu/03700/03797/03797.htm#8 - Péter, Tibor Nagy. The social and political history of Hungarian education. . Freely available on mek.oszk.hu

Universities
Education in Hungary
Hungary
Hungary